The 2021–22 National Cricket League was the twenty-third edition of the National Cricket League (NCL), a first-class cricket competition that was scheduled to be held in Bangladesh from 15 October to 25 November 2021. In March 2021, Bangladesh Cricket Board (BCB) announced the domestic cricket schedule from 2021 to 2023 and confirmed that the 23rd NCL would be held in October 2021. Khulna Division are the defending champions.

Dhaka Division won the tournament, with Chittagong Division gaining promotion from tier 2 to tier 1.

Fixtures

Tier 1
Points table

Tier 2
Points table

See also 

 2021–22 Bangladesh Premier League
2021–22 Bangladesh Cricket League

References

External links
 Series home at ESPN Cricinfo

 

Bangladesh National Cricket League
Domestic cricket competitions in 2021–22
2021 in Bangladeshi cricket
Bangladeshi cricket seasons from 2000–01